The Sword of Barbarossa (Italian:La scimitarra di Barbarossa) is a 1921 Italian silent film directed by Mario Corsi.

Cast
 Olimpia Barroero 
 Ludovico Bendiner 
 Carmen Boni 
 Rina Calabria 
 Teresa Calabria 
 Amos Incroci 
 Lina Millefleurs 
 Luigi Moneta 
 Enrico Piacentini 
 Thea Sprenger 
 Ernesto Treves
 Carlo Troisi - Ave Maria (1920 film)
 Gino Viotti

References

Bibliography
 Stewart, John. Italian film: a who's who. McFarland, 1994.

External links

1921 films
1920s Italian-language films
Italian silent feature films
Italian black-and-white films